Harold James Phillip "Tiga" Bayles (6 October 1953 – 17 April 2016) was an Australian radio presenter and indigenous rights activist.

Bayles was raised in Theodore, Queensland, and was the son of Maureen Watson. With his mother, Bayles established Radio Redfern, an indigenous radio program on Sydney community station Radio Skid Row. In 1982, he was involved with the Aboriginal movement protests around the 1982 Commonwealth Games.

Moving back to Brisbane, Bayles helped establish the Brisbane Indigenous Media Association (BIMA) which operated the radio station 98.9 FM (Brisbane), with the guidance of his uncle Ross Watson. Bayles hosted the program Let's Talk which discussed issues relevant to First Nations people.

Bayles died of cancer on 17 April 2016, aged 62.

References

1953 births
2016 deaths
Australian radio presenters
Australian indigenous rights activists
Deaths from cancer in Queensland